Stella Etc. is a children's book series by British author Karen McCombie. It was published between 2004 and 2007, with an omnibus edition published in 2010.

The series is about a girl called Stella, her family and her friends. After moving from London, Stella lives in the seaside town of Portbay with her family, including twin brothers Jamie (who bites) and Jake (who has ginger hair). Stella is a friendly girl who is always ready to give people a chance, no matter what they have been like in the past. She is always on the lookout for possible new friends, and one new friend is added to the group in each book. Stella has brown hair and freckles and a stutter that comes and goes. 

Peaches, a strange ginger cat, wanders through the series, giving Stella mysterious signs and bringing the scent of peaches and cream.

Throughout the series, Stella uncovers secrets about Joseph's House, the servant, Joseph, and his best friend, Elize Grainger.

References

External links
 Karen McCombie's Stella Etc page

British children's novels
Series of children's books
2000s children's books